Jim Paidas (born April 24, 1956 in Stamford, Connecticut) is an American brand-building executive and intellectual property licensing agent. He was also the drummer in the 1970s and 1980s rock bands Ambush and Rough Cut.

Career
Paidas founded Promotion Sales, Ltd. in 1982, a Connecticut-based advertising and promotional merchandise company, working with clients: American Tobacco Co., Nine West, Liz Claiborne, Kenneth Cole Productions, and World Wrestling Entertainment (WWE).

Paidas assisted the WWE for twenty years developing their live-venue merchandise programs utilizing branded retail merchandise, premiums, and promotional marketing products. He worked on all of their marquis events, including: WrestleMania, Smackdown, Raw, Royal Rumble and King of the Ring. He also was instrumental in developing a line of branded merchandise for WWE's XFL Arena Football League and assisted in their initial network broadcast rollout.

In 2004, Paidas founded Paidas Management, an intellectual property licensing management company, and worked with the Discovery/TLC reality-series Orange County Choppers as a licensing agent and built the brand into a retail licensing juggernaut with $400M millions dollars of product sold worldwide through a group of over seventy licensees to mid-tier, specialty, and mass retail channels of distribution.

In 2006, Paidas added two more Discovery Channel hit shows to his roster: Boyd Coddington's American Hotrod and Dog the Bounty Hunter. He successfully secured leading licensees for soft goods / apparel, footwear, accessories, toys, collectibles, and tools resulting in $100M million dollars of product sold worldwide.

Paidas also developed the Rockstalgia rock clothing line with Jon Levin from the 1980s rock band Dokken. Rockstalgia was an imprinted apparel driven program that brought album cover artwork from the most popular bands from the 1960s, '70s, and '80s to a diverse group of retail licensees.

In 2011, Paidas acted as the exclusive licensing agent for Vexcon (Billy the Exterminator).

In 2013, he developed the brand The Rock Factor, again with Jon Levin, which was a fan-based, interactive, rock-star phone and merchandise website where fans could speak directly to their favorite stars and purchase merchandise online.

In January 2014, Paidas was again retained by Orange County Choppers in his role as Vice President of Business Development responsible for brand-building through use of sponsorships, endorsements, on-air bike-builds, experiential marketing, client activation, appearances, and licensing.

For 2017, Paidas has once again found himself working with and representing a who's who of clients including: Formula 1 and NHRA teams, Doug Asermely of Sickies Garage, and Jo Coddington of Discovery Channel's American Hot Rod fame.

In May 2017, Virtuous Vices, LLC, a New York-based company specializing in direct-to-consumer monthly subscription boxes, doing business as Robb Vices, has retained Paidas Management in a business development role, naming Jim Paidas as Director of Corporate and Special Markets, to enhance their footprint in the corporate premium space. Robb Vices is a subscription based service centered on the monthly delivery of “storied treasures”. Every month, they deliver a box of bespoke products and experiences that have been specially curated by the well-heeled lifestyle experts at Robb Vices.

As of 2019, Paidas is working with Doc McGhee of McGhee Entertainment and with rock band KISS on their End of the Road World Tour. In a business development role, Paidas is pursuing corporate advertising, sponsorships, experiential marketing, and fan activation opportunities. Through such partnerships, businesses are able to gain maximum advertising visibility, worldwide exposure, and media value. By partnering with KISS and taking advantage of the publicity generated due to their popularity, broad-based appeal and connectivity to all forms of media, social media, and entertainment channels, businesses typically obtain a media value equivalency of five to ten times the cost associated with a traditional media buy. Paidas also created a line of premiums that will be available for distribution by Doc McGhee and the band until the close of the End of the Road World Tour.

1956 births
Living people
20th-century American businesspeople